Queen Kang of the Sincheon Gang clan (died 915) was the daughter of a wealthy and strong family in Sincheon during the Later Three Kingdoms periods. She was the wife of Gung Ye and later became the queen consort in 901 following his ascension to the throne as a short-lived King of the State of Taebong.

Historical life
Lady Kang was married to Gung Ye (궁예) and bore him 2 sons: Cheong-gwang (청광) and Sin-gwang (신광). However, Gung Ye suspected that she might have committed adultery and accused her of doing such things, then used a fiery hot iron pestle to mutilate(or pare) her vagina and killed their sons.  As Gung Ye often boasted that he could read people's minds, he practiced a harsh government of terror, such as killing several generals and servants for treason just like Kang.

Legends

Legend from Cheorwon
According to a legend passed down in Cheorwon, Gangwon Province, it was said that Lady Kang was actually married her far-relative, Wang Geon, but forced to marry Gung Ye and couldn't forget Wang Geon. From this, it was described that she was killed by Gung Ye after discovered for having an affair with Wang Geon.

Legend from Gapyeong
Meanwhile, according to a legend passed down in Gapyeong, Gyeonggi Province that contrary to history, Queen Kang asked Gung Ye to stop his tyranny government, but instead make Gung Ye becomes anger and she then exiled to the one of Gapyeong's mountain. Later on, as Gung Ye ran away when Wang Geon's counter-revolution broke out, he couldn't forget Kang's advice for him and went to Gapyeong, where she was exiled. However, Kang had already died when Gung Ye was there.

In popular culture

In the novel
In a novel titled "Crown Prince Maui" (마의태자) by Lee Kwang-soo (이광수), Lady Kang was named as Kang Na-young (강나영) and described as a person with outstanding martial arts and resourcefulness. However, she was disappointed with Gung Ye's tyranny and stalked Wang Geon while eventually died in Gung Ye's hand.

In the TV series
In the KBS1 TV series "Taejo Wang Geon", Lady Kang was named as Kang Yeon-hwa (강연화), which "Yeon-hwa" resembles the image of a single lotus blooming in the mud. She was said to originally betrothed with Wang Geon since childhood and loved each other, but were separated after Wang's father, Wang Ryung declined this betrothal. Described as an ideal wife due to her beautiful, strong personality, and wise, she was respected by many. Being aware of her position, she never tried to get involved in country affairs more than necessary, but she must live twisted upon becoming an unwanted empress.

Regardless of the fact that she couldn't connect with her loved one and her husband never showed any affection at all although she served Gung Ye with all of her heart as a husband and king. As soon as their children were born, they were taken away by him and Kang couldn't raise any of them herself. Due to Gung Ye's circumstances, the country was literally living hell and whenever Kang went to an event or public speaking, Gung Ye became mad and all kinds of slaughter took place. Although she wanted to try to do something, she couldn't get involved in politics due to her position as a woman and then tried her best to advise Gung Ye, which instead made Gung Ye's madness getting worse. She later abused Gung Ye and openly encouraged Wang Geon to revolt, which she and her two sons were sacrificed for Gung Ye's madness at the end.Queen Kang is portrayed by Kim Hye-ri and Jung-hoo in the 2000-2002 KBS1 TV series Taejo Wang Geon.

Family
Husband: Gung Ye (궁예, 弓裔; died 918)
Son: Sin Gwang (신광, 神光; d. 915)
Son: Cheong Gwang (청광, 淸光; d. 915)

Ancestors

References

Citations

Further reading

Kim Yong-sun (2008). "궁예의 나라 태봉". . Iljogak. Retrieved June 28, 2021.

915 deaths
Year of birth unknown
People related with Late Three Kingdoms
Executed Korean women
Korean royal consorts
9th-century Korean women
10th-century Korean women